Stanislav Yulianovich Chekan (2 June 1922, Rostov-on-Don — 11 August 1994, Moscow) was a Soviet actor of theater and cinema, known primarily for his blue-collar manly appearance, and character actor roles of a stereotypical "big guy."

Biography 
Stanislav Chekan was born in Rostov-on-Don on 2 June 1922. When he was 15 years old, his father was arrested as an enemy of the people. Stanislav was sent to a labor colony, where he first began to participate in amateur activities. Then he was sent to a vocational school, but on the way he turned to Rostov, where he entered another school, a theater school.

From 1938 to 1941 he studied at the studio of Yuri Zavadsky in the Theater School of Rostov-on-Don.

Member of the Great Patriotic War, fought near Novorossiysk, after a serious injury — the actor of the front-line theater.

In 1945 Stanislav Chekan became an actor of the Odessa Theater of the Soviet Army, then, in 1948—1956 — an actor of the Central Academic Theater of the Soviet Army in Moscow, in 1958-1993 — National Film Actors' Theatre.

Stanislav Chekan   a textured and colorful character artist, with great charm and sense of humor. As a rule, the screen characters of Chekan are real working men, strong and courageous people. Soviet and Russian viewers are most known for the role of Mikhail Ivanovich, the police captain, in the legendary comedy by Leonid Gaidai The Diamond Arm.

Stanislav Chekan died on 11 August 1994 after a long illness. He was buried in Moscow at the Vagankovo Cemetery.

Selected filmography

 Son of the Regiment (1946) as soldier
 Blue Roads (1948) as Kapitan-leytenant (uncredited)
 Taras Shevchenko (1951) as cabby
 A Fortress in the Mountains (1953) as Martshenko
 Devotion (1954) as Vasya Zhuk
 Behind the Footlights (1956) as Stepan, coachman
 Wrestler and Clown (1957) as Ivan Poddubny
 Ocherednoy reys (1958)
 Annushka (1959) as Soldat
 Chudotvornaya (1960)
 V nachale veka (1961) as Melnik
 Dve zhizni (1961) as Petrenko
 Nash obshchiy drug (1962) as Semyon
 Hussar Ballad (1962) as Guerilla (uncredited)
 Amphibian Man (1962) as prison guard
 V myortvoy petle (1963) as lyotchik Yefimov
 Khod konyom (1963) as Ignatiy Pudov
 Introduction to Life (1963) as captain
 The First Trolleybus (1963) as First Trolleybus Driver
 Bolshoy fitil (1964) as Voditel
 Verte mne, lyudi (1965) as Kain-Baty
 Svet dalyokoy zvezdy (1965)
 Inostranka (1965)
 Eskadra ukhodit na zapad (1965) as Panas Marshuk
 My, russkiy narod (1966)
 War and Peace (1966) as Tikhon Cherbaty
 Rabochiy posyolok (1966) as Akhromovich
 Chiisai tôbôsha (1966)
 Two Tickets for a Daytime Picture Show (1967) as Sabodazh
 Dikiy myod (1967)
 Net i da (1967) as Yelpidifor
 Tashkent - gorod khlebny (1968) as Meshochnik
  (1968) as Elpidifor
 The New Adventures of the Elusive Avengers (1968) as 1 st filer in the pot
 The Brothers Karamazov (1969) as Samsonov's son
 Virineya (1969)
 The Diamond Arm (1969) as Mikhail Ivanovoch, Captain, then Major of militsiya
 Krakh (1969) as Ivan Yegorov
 Kamurjner moratsutyan vrayov (1970) as Bandit
 Sevastopol (1970) as Botsman
 The Crown of the Russian Empire, or Once Again the Elusive Avengers (1971) as a man from the Emperor's suite
 Investigation Held by ZnaToKi: Dead to Rights (1971, TV Movie) as Silin
 Zoia Rukhadze (1971) as Turkin
 Smertnyy vrag (1972) as Ignat Yashchurov
 Dacha (1973) as Shofer
 Privalov's Millions (1973) as Kuzma Ferapontovich Kanunnikov
 Neylon 100% (1973) as Bubnov
 Rayskie yablochki (1974) as Politseyskiy
 Severnaya rapsodiya (1974)
 Earthly Love (1975) as Koshev
 Povtornaya svadba (1976) as Pyotr Nikolayevich - direktor tsementnogo zavoda
 Pobeditel (1976) as Akim
  (1976) as Dyagenka
 How Czar Peter the Great Married Off His Moor (1976) as marshal
 Razvlechenie dlya starichkov (1977) as Roman Stepanovich Guskov
 Solntse, snova solntse (1977) as Rybak
 Destiny (1977) as Pavel Koshev
 Gonki bez finisha (1977)
 Incognito from St. Petersburg (1978) as Ivan Karpovich Uhovertov, marshal
 Life Is Beautiful (1979) as a prisoner
 Serebryanye ozyora (1981)
 Vertical Race (1982, TV Movie) as captain of militia
 Ochen vazhnaya persona (1984) as Alekseich
 Tayna zolotoy gory (1985)

Recognition and rewards 
 Medal "For the Defence of the Caucasus" (1944)
 Medal "For the Victory over Germany in the Great Patriotic War 1941–1945" (1945)
 Honored Artist of the RSFSR (1955)
 Jubilee Medal "Twenty Years of Victory in the Great Patriotic War 1941–1945" (1965)
Order of the Badge of Honour (1974)
Jubilee Medal "Thirty Years of Victory in the Great Patriotic War 1941–1945" (1975)
 Order of the Patriotic War 2nd class (1989)
 Medal "Veteran of Labour" (1989)

References

External links
 
 

1922 births
1994 deaths
Soviet male film actors
Actors from Rostov-on-Don
Soviet male voice actors
Honored Artists of the RSFSR
Burials at Vagankovo Cemetery
Soviet military personnel of World War II